Niels Arestrup (born 8 February 1949) is a French-Danish actor, film director and screenwriter. He has won three César Awards.

Biography
Arestrup was born in Paris into a family of modest means; his father was Danish and his mother was Breton.

Arestrup has won three César Awards for Best Supporting Actor for The Beat That My Heart Skipped and A Prophet, then Quai d'Orsay. The two first films were directed by Jacques Audiard. He is the most awarded in this category.

Theatre

Filmography

As actor

As director/writer

Box-office 
Movies starring Niels Arestrup with more than a million of entries in France.

Accolades

References

External links

See also

1949 births
Living people
Danish male film actors
Danish male television actors
French people of Danish descent
Officers of the Ordre national du Mérite
Danish film directors
Danish male screenwriters
20th-century Danish male actors
21st-century Danish male actors
Male actors from Paris
Best Supporting Actor César Award winners